Đorđe Andrijašević (born 5 May 1931), credited as Giorgio Andrijassevic in Italy, is a Serbian professional basketball former player and former coach. He represented the Yugoslavia national basketball team internationally. He was the first coach to use full-court press technique in Europe.

Playing career 
Andrijašević played for Crvena zvezda from 1950 to 1956. During that time he won six Yugoslav Championships.

In July 1950, he was a member of the Zvezda squad that won an international cup tournament in Milan, Italy.

After 1955, he played in Italy and France.

National team career 
As a player for the Yugoslavia national basketball team Andrijašević participated in 1954 FIBA World Championship and 1953 and 1955 European Championship. Andrijašević has played 47 games for the national team.

Coaching career 
Andrijašević played and coached Pallacanestro Pavia from 1955 to 1958. From 1962 to 1970 he coached the JA Vichy (in 1962–63 as player-coach), winning two French Cups and reaching the finals of the European Cup Winner's Cup in 1970. Andrijašević led Olympique Antibes in second place in the championship and the semifinals at FIBA Korać Cup in 1984.

Andrijašević was the first one to use full-court press technique in Europe. His zone press was an adapted and improved version of Gene Johnson's full-court press. He used it for the first time with French team JA Vichy in 1965.

Career achievements

Player 
 Yugoslav League champion: 6 (with Crvena zvezda: 1950, 1951, 1952, 1953, 1954, 1955).

Coach
 French Cup winner: 2 (with JA Vichy: 1968–69, 1969–70).
 Yugoslav Cup winner: 1 (with Crvena zvezda: 1970–71).

See also 
 List of KK Crvena zvezda players with 100 games played
 List of Red Star Belgrade basketball coaches

References

1931 births
Living people
Guards (basketball)
Serbian expatriate basketball people in France
Serbian expatriate basketball people in Italy
Yugoslav men's basketball players
Yugoslav basketball coaches
Serbian men's basketball players
Serbian men's basketball coaches
KK Crvena zvezda players
KK Crvena zvezda head coaches
Pallacanestro Pavia players
1954 FIBA World Championship players
JA Vichy players